Kukavičko Lake is a lake of Bosnia and Herzegovina. It is located in the municipality of Kupres.

See also
List of lakes in Bosnia and Herzegovina

References

Lakes of Bosnia and Herzegovina